M80 or M-80 may refer to:

Military 
 BVP M-80, a Yugoslav military vehicle
 M80, a U.S. military type of the 7.62×51mm NATO rifle cartridge
 M80, training version of the M19 mine
 M80 Stiletto, a 2006 prototype naval vessel
 M80 Zolja, a Yugoslav anti-tank rocket launcher
 Zastava M80, an assault rifle

Transportation
 M-80 (Michigan highway), a state highway in the Upper Peninsula of Michigan
 M80 motorway, a motorway in Scotland
 M80 Ring Road (aka Western Ring Road and Metropolitan Ring Road), a freeway in Melbourne, Australia

Other uses
 M-80 (band), an American punk band
 M-80 (explosive), a large firecracker
 M80 Radio, a radio station from Portugal and Spain
 Monster M-80, a tropical juice energy drink
 M 80, an age group for Masters athletics (athletes aged 35+)
 M80/2, the vehicle used on the M-Bahn in Berlin, Germany
 Messier 80, a globular cluster in the constellation Scorpius
 Microsoft MACRO-80, a macro assembler
 M-80, a minor Hydra-affiliated character in Marvel Comics

See also
 Matey (disambiguation)
 Mighty (disambiguation)